Andrew Phillips may refer to:

 Andrew Phillips (historian), English historian
 Andrew Phillips (lawyer), American deaf civil rights advocate
 Andrew Phillips, Baron Phillips of Sudbury (born 1939), British solicitor and Liberal Democrat politician
 Andrew Phillips (footballer, born 1970), Australian rules footballer for Carlton
 Andrew Phillips (footballer, born 1991), Australian rules footballer for Essendon, Greater Western Sydney and Carlton
 Andrew Phillips (swimmer) (born 1962), Jamaican swimmer
 Andrew Phillips (priest), Archdeacon of Brecon, 1578–1620

See also
Andy Phillips (disambiguation), multiple people